Cypress Lake is an interbasin transfer reservoir in the Canadian province of Saskatchewan on the southern slopes of the Cypress Hills in the Rural Municipality of Reno No. 51. The reservoir was created by the damming of the east and west sides of a much smaller Cypress Lake in the late 1930s. There is a provincial recreation site on the southern shore and a wildlife refuge on Heglund Island in the lake. Access to the lake is from Township Road 60 off of Highway 21.

Cypress Lake is the source of the Frenchman River and, being an interbasin reservoir, it supplies water to both the Frenchman River and Battle Creek watersheds. Frenchman River begins at Dam One on the eastern end of the lake while an outlet canal from Dam Two on the western end supplies water to Battle Creek.

Irrigation project 
The building of the two dams of Cypress Lake were part of a larger project to bring stability to the water levels of Battle Creek as during the summer months, Battle Creek would often run dry. In 1936, near the headwaters of Battle Creek in the Cypress Hills, a dam was built along Adams Creek – a tributary of Battle Creek – that created Adams Lake. During the dry months, water could be released from Adams Lake to help prevent Battle Creek from dying up, which allowed for irrigation throughout the growing season. With plans originally conceived in 1908, Cypress Lake was also turned into a reservoir in the late 1930s.

In 1937, contracts were handed out to several different companies to build various parts of the reservoir project at Cypress Lake, such as the building of Dam One at the east end of the lake, Dam Two at the west end, supply canals, outlet canals, the concrete structure, and the gravel facing for the earthen dams. Water for Cypress lake is supplied by diverting water from Belanger, Battle, and Sucker Creeks. Like Adams Lake, water from Cypress Lake is stored and then released during the dry season.

Cypress Lake Recreation Site 
Cypress Lake Recreation Site is a provincial recreation site on the southern shore of Cypress Lake. It is a small, free campground with lake access and a boat launch.

Heglund Island Wildlife Refuge 
Heglund Island Wildlife Refuge is a Saskatchewan wildlife refuge on Heglund Island in Cypress Lake.

Fish species 
Fish commonly found in the lake include walleye and northern pike.

See also 
List of lakes of Saskatchewan
List of protected areas of Saskatchewan
Tourism in Saskatchewan

References 

Lakes of Saskatchewan
Reno No. 51, Saskatchewan
Dams in Saskatchewan
Interbasin transfer